Andrew Booker is a British drummer and vocalist best known for his work with Tim Bowness (in Bowness's solo band, No-Man and in Henry Fool) and with ex-Yes guitarist Peter Banks (in the improvising band Harmony in Diversity).

Booker has also released a solo mini-album Ahead and had a duo called Pulse Engine with Nick Cottam (bass). He also played with London-band The Fugitives, Michael Bearpark and David Cross. Booker organised the website and evening Improvizone, which led to one compilation available through the Burning Shed label.

Discography

Andrew Booker, Ahead (1996)
The Fugitives, Promo (2003)
Harmony in Diversity, Trying (2006)
Darkroom, Some of These Numbers Mean Something (2008)
No-Man, Schoolyard Ghosts (2008)
No-Man, Wherever There is Light  (2009)
The Fugitives, Sanskara (2010)
Schoolyard Ghosts, Memories of Machines (2011)
No-Man, Love and Endings (2012)
Sanguine Hum, The Weight of the World (2013)
Henry Fool, Men Singing (2013)
Darkroom, Gravity's Dirty Work (2013)
Sanguine Hum, Now We Have Light (2015)
Tim Bowness, Stupid Things That Mean the World (2015)
Tim Bowness, Lost in the Ghost Light (2017)
Peter Banks's Harmony in Diversity, The Complete Recordings (2018)
David Cross & Andrew Booker, Ends Meeting (2018)

References

External links
Improvizone, online rock improvisation space led by Andrew Booker

Year of birth missing (living people)
Living people
English drummers
British male drummers